Melmalayanur is located near Gingee, Tamil Nadu, India, 21 km from chetput (Tiruvannamalai District) and 21 km away from Gingee (Villupuram District) It is famous for the Goddess Angalaamman. Devotees across South India visit this temple to avail blessings of Angalaamman.

Lakhs of devotees visit here every newmoon and fullmoon days since it is supposed to be auspicious during these days. Melmalayanur is assembly constituency which will send representative to the members to the state assembly.

Location
Melmalayanur located at 10 km from Avalurpet, 40 km from Thiruvannamalai, 21 km from Gingee, and 35 km from Villupuram.
Since devotees come to Avalurpet and gingee then go to Melmalayanur because Avalupet and Gingee connect NH and State Highway.

1)koyambedu-perungalathur-melmaruvathur-thindivanam-gingee-melmalayanur. 2)Kancheepuram-Vandavasi-Chetpet-Valathy/Avalurpet-Melmalayanur. 
3)Kancheepuram-Cheyyaru-Pernamallur-Chetpet-Valathy/Avalurpet-Melmalayanur.
4)Trichy-Villupuram-gingee-melmalayanur.
5)Pondicherry-Thindivanam-Gingee-melmalayanur.
6)Bangalore -Hosur -krishnagiri -oothangarai-chengam -thiruvannamalai -avalurpet -Melmalayanur

References

External links
 Sri Angalaparameshwari Temple

Cities and towns in Viluppuram district